Baba Ndaw Seck (born 25 December 1995) is a Senegalese professional footballer who plays as a forward for Calcio Ghedi 2009.

Career
Born in Dakar, Seck arrived at Brescia's youth setup in January 2012, aged 16. After progressing through the youth setup he was assigned to the Primavera squad but also handed #16 jersey with the first-team.

On 16 November 2013 Seck made his professional debut, coming on as a late substitute in a 0–0 draw at Padova.

In 2017 Seck played in the Romanian fourth league for Universitatea Cluj.

References

External links
Brescia official profile 

Baba Seck at TuttoCampo

1995 births
Living people
People from Dakar
Senegalese footballers
Association football forwards
Serie B players
Liga Portugal 2 players
Brescia Calcio players
U.S. Poggibonsi players
FC Universitatea Cluj players
Varzim S.C. players
Real S.C. players
F.C. Arouca players
Senegalese expatriate footballers
Senegalese expatriate sportspeople in Italy
Expatriate footballers in Italy
Senegalese expatriate sportspeople in Romania
Expatriate footballers in Romania
Senegalese expatriate sportspeople in Portugal
Expatriate footballers in Portugal